Poria hypobrunnea is a plant pathogen infecting tea.

References

External links 
 Index Fungorum
 USDA ARS Fungal Database

Fungal plant pathogens and diseases
Tea diseases
hypobrunnea
Taxa named by Thomas Petch